"Sexy Ida" is a single released by R&B duo Ike & Tina Turner on United Artists Records in August 1974. It features two versions, the A-side "Sexy Ida (Part 1)" and the B-side "Sexy Ida (Part 2)."

Overview
"Sexy Ida" was written by Tina Turner; produced by Ike Turner, Claude Williams, and Gerhard Augustin. It was recorded at the Turners' studio Bolic Sound in June 1974. Similar to their hit single "Nutbush City Limits," Part 1 is characterized by inventive guitar sounds, a substantial synthesizer solo, and a funky brass section. Part 2 is a faster tempo and features T. Rex guitarist Marc Bolan.

"Sexy Ida (Part 1)" peaked at No. 51 in the UK, and was a hit in several other European countries. It is one of the duo's final chart hits, reaching No. 29 on Billboard Hot Soul Singles and No. 65 on the Billboard Hot 100. "Sexy Ida (Part 2)" peaked at No. 85 on the Hot 100 and No. 49 on the Soul Singles chart. It also reached No. 67 on the Cash Box Top 100 Singles chart.

Part 1 and 2 were intended to be released on the album Sweet Rhode Island Red, but the songs were not registered in due time. However, both were later included on the album in some European countries to promote their tour.

Critical reception 
Blues & Soul (October 8, 1974): "Every now and then Ike and Tina burst through with a giant. Last time around, it was 'Nutbush City Limits' and then followed a couple of duds. Now Tina shrieks her way through a bubbling disco item that is virtually assured of both pop and soul victory in this country."

Track listing

Chart performance

References

External links 
"Sexy Ida (Part 1)" at Discogs
Ike & Tina Turner Chart History - Hot 100 at Billboard
"Sexy Ida (Part 1)" appears on at All Music Guide

1974 singles
1974 songs
Ike & Tina Turner songs
Song recordings produced by Ike Turner
United Artists Records singles
Funk rock songs
Songs written by Tina Turner